The minbar is the location within a mosque where the imam stands.

Minbar may also refer to:

 Minbar (planet), the home planet of the Minbari, a fictional species within the Babylon 5 universe

See also
 Al Menbar (disambiguation)
 Golden Minbar International Film Festival
 Minibar (disambiguation)